Cully Hamner (born 1969) is an American comic book artist, known for his work on such books as Green Lantern: Mosaic, Blue Beetle, Black Lightning: Year One, and Detective Comics. He is also the co-creator and illustrator of the 2003 graphic novel Red, which was adapted into a 2010 feature film of the same name starring Bruce Willis, as well as a 2013 sequel.

Early life
Cully Hamner was born March 7, 1969 in Huntsville, Alabama. He graduated from Albert P. Brewer High School in Somerville, Alabama.

Career
Since his 1992 debut on Green Lantern: Mosaic, Hamner has worked for nearly every major American comic book publisher, and is chiefly known for such titles as the aforementioned Green Lantern: Mosaic, Blue Beetle, and Red. He is also one of the original members of Atlanta's Gaijin Studios. Hamner also helped start and acted as Creative Consultant to 12 Gauge Comics, publisher of such titles as The Ride, Gun Candy, Body Bags, and O.C.T.: The Occult Crimes Taskforce.

His work can be seen in Top Cow's 2005 Warren Ellis series Down and as the co-ceator, original artist, and designer of DC Comics'  current Blue Beetle character. He was the regular artist for that character's monthly series in 2006 and 2007, leaving that title with its tenth issue, though he continued throughout the following year as the regular cover artist for that book.  Black Lightning: Year One, written by Jen Van Meter and illustrated by Hamner, was released in 2009 as a miniseries and as a trade paperback collection in 2010, and was subsequently nominated for two Glyph Awards.

In March 2009, it was announced that Hamner had signed an exclusive contract with DC Comics, and in June 2009, he began his run on the monthly Detective Comics, featuring The Question.  After concluding his year-long tenure on that character and in light of the pending release of the film version of Red, it was announced that Hamner would return to both write and illustrate the Paul Moses character for a 40-page prequel called Red: Eyes Only.

In 2010, Summit Entertainment released RED, a feature film adaptation of the 2003 comic book of the same name that Hamner illustrated with writer Warren Ellis, starring Bruce Willis, Morgan Freeman, Helen Mirren, John Malkovich and Richard Dreyfuss.

On June 9, 2011, it was revealed by DC Comics co-publisher Jim Lee that Hamner had been enlisted in a substantial role to help guide the initiative to redesign DC's stable of characters as part of the "New 52" line-wide relaunch.  On July 12, Comic Book Resources reported DC's announcement that Hamner would be teaming with writer James Dale Robinson for the first three-issue story arc of a new 12-issue series starring The Shade.

On July 19, 2013, RED 2, the sequel to RED, was released in North America.  The film stars Bruce Willis, John Malkovich, Mary-Louise Parker, Catherine Zeta-Jones, Lee Byung-hun, Anthony Hopkins, and Helen Mirren, with Dean Parisot directing a screenplay by Jon and Erich Hoeber.  In its opening weekend, the film grossed $18.5 million and finished in fifth place, which was lower than the $21.8 million its predecessor earned in October 2010. According to exit polling, 67% of the audience was over 35 and 52% was male. Red 2 grossed $53.3 million in North America and $94.8 million overseas for a total of $148.1 million worldwide.

In the spring of 2015, Hamner reteamed with writer Greg Rucka to produce a two-issue coda to their run on the Renee Montoya character in Detective Comics.  Convergence: The Question was released by DC Entertainment in April and May 2015.

On August 14, 2015, it was announced that NBC was developing an hour-long based RED television series produced by screenwriters Jon Hoeber and Erich Hoeber, along with Lorenzo di Bonaventura and Mark Vahradian. Lionsgate Television and Di Bonaventura Pictures Television would be producing the series.

On June 17, 2016, Lionsgate announced that it would be teaming with Indian actor/producer Anil Kapoor’s AKFC production banner on a Hindi version of RED for the Indian market.

On June 21, 2017, RED producer Lorenzo di Bonaventura stated that a script for RED 3 had been commissioned, and that he was "waiting for [it] right now."

In August 2017, it was announced in The Hollywood Reporter that Hamner would be returning to DC Comics to illustrate Batman And The Signal, a three-issue mini-series teaming Batman and the Duke Thomas character (now known as The Signal).  The series is written by fan-favorite writer Scott Snyder and newcomer Tony Patrick (a graduate of the DC Comics Writers Workshop).

Bibliography

Comics series
 Batman And The Signal #1-3 (2017), with writers Scott Snyder and Tony Patrick
 Convergence: The Question #1-2 (2015), with writer Greg Rucka
 Legends of the Dark Knight #80-82 (2015), with writer Ron Marz
 Future's End, Week 21 (2014), with writer Jeff Lemire
 Animal Man #36 (2014), with writer Jeff Lemire
 Flash Annual #2 (2013), with writer NiCole DuBuc
 Action Comics Annual #1 (2012), with writer Sholly Fisch
 Action Comics #14 (2012), with writer Sholly Fisch
 National Comics: Eternity #1 (2012), with writer Jeff LeMire
 The Shade #1-3 (2011), with writer James Dale Robinson
 Detective Comics #854-865 (2009–2010), serial co-feature "The Question," with writer Greg Rucka
 Black Lightning: Year One #1-6 (2009) with writer Jen Van Meter
 Blue Beetle #1, 2, 4, 7, 8, 10 (2006–2007) with writers Keith Giffen and John Rogers
 Down #2-4 (2005–2006) with writer Warren Ellis for Top Cow
 Red 3-issue miniseries (2003–2004) with writer Warren Ellis for Wildstorm
 Batman: Tenses 2-issue miniseries (2003) with writer Joe Casey for DC Comics
 Uncanny X-Men #400 (2001) with writer Joe Casey for Marvel Comics
 The Titans #14 (2000) with writers Brian K. Vaughn and Devin Grayson for DC Comics
 Wonder Woman #153 (2000) (finishes) with artist Georges Jeanty and writer Mark Millar for DC Comics
 Green Lantern Secret Files (1999) with writer Ron Marz for DC Comics
 Tom Strong #3  (1999) with writer Alan Moore and artist Chris Sprouse for America's Best Comics
 Daredevil #379 (1998) with writer Scott Lobdell for Marvel Comics
 Daredevil #376 (1998) with writer Scott Lobdell for Marvel Comics
 Uncanny X-Men #352 (1998) with writer Steven T. Seagle for Marvel Comics
 Robin #42, 46 (1997), (layouts) with writer Chuck Dixon for DC Comics
 Penthouse Comix #23 (1996) for General Media
 Men's Adventure Comix #3 (1996) for General Media
 Captain America: Sentinel of Liberty #8 (1996) with writer Mark Waid for Marvel Comics
 Green Lantern #58 (1995) with writer Ron Marz for DC Comics
 Firearm (1994–1995) with writer James Dale Robinson for Malibu Comics
 Silver Surfer #83 (1993) with writer Ron Marz for Marvel Comics
 Green Lantern: Mosaic #1-5, 7–10, 12, 13, and 15 (1992–1993) with writer Gerard Jones for DC Comics

Comics anthologies and one-shots
 Red: Eyes Only one-shot (2010), both written and illustrated by Hamner.
 Metal Hurlant anthology (2005), Pieces De Rechange (Spare Parts) with writer Stuart Moore for Les Humanoides
 Star Wars Tales anthology (2005), Marked with writer Rob Williams for Dark Horse Comics
 Spider-Man Unlimited anthology (2005), Amnesiac with writer Petar Bridges for Marvel Comics
 The Ride: 2 For The Road anthology (2005), Big Plans both story and art for 12 Gauge Comics
 The Ride: Wheels Of Change anthology (2004), Act One with writer Doug Wagner for 12 Gauge Comics
 Marvel Universe: Millennial Visions anthology (2002), Power Pack for Marvel Comics
 Wildstorm Summer Special anthology (2001), Orbital with writer Warren Ellis for Wildstorm
 Weird Western Tales anthology #4 (2001), Savaged with writer Bruce Jones for Vertigo Comics
 Young Justice: Sins of Youth Secret Files anthology #1 (2001) for DC Comics
 Gen-Active anthology #5 (2001), Father's Day with writer Jay Faerber for Wildstorm
 DCU 2000 Secret Files one-shot (2000), Aliens in the DCU for DC Comics
 X-Men Unlimited anthology #29 (2000), Tempered Steel both story and art for Marvel Comics
 Authority Annual 2000 one-shot (2000) with writer Joe Casey for Wildstorm
 X-Men: Millennial Visions anthology (2000), Project: Cerebro-X for Marvel Comics
 Superman Metropolis Secret Files anthology (2000), Municipal Bonds with writer Mark Schultz for DC Comics
 DC One Million 80-Page Giant anthology (1999), The Divided Self with writer Grant Morrison for DC Comics
 Secret Origins 80-Page Giant anthology (1998), Little Wing with writer Chuck Dixon for DC Comics
 Timeslip Collection anthology (1998), Sub-Mariner for Marvel Comics
 Superman Villains Secret Files anthology (1998), Your Power is His (Parasite) with writer Roger Stern for Marvel Comics
 Batman Chronicles anthology #9 (1997), (layouts) for DC Comics
 Stormwatch Special one-shot #2 (1995) with writer Ron Marz for Image Comics/Wildstorm

Pin-ups and covers
 The Shade #1-3 (2011), variant covers
 Red: Eyes Only one-shot (2010), for Wildstorm
 Red, four movie prequel one-shots, for Wildstorm
 Black Lightning: Year One mini-series (2009) #1-6 covers
 Blue Beetle #1-2, 10, 13-24 covers
 Red mini-series (2003), covers
 Batman: Tenses mini-series (2003), covers
 Transmetropolitan: I Hate it Here anthology (2000)
 Day of Judgment Secret Files anthology (1999), profile: The Phantom Stranger
 Legion of Super-Heroes Secret Files anthology (1999), Ferro
 Superman Secret Files anthology (1999), Gog pin-up
 Legion: Secret Files anthology (1998), Ultra Boy pin-up
 Legion of Super-Heroes #100, untitled pin-up
 Daredevil #376-379 (1998), covers
 Robin #42-51 (1997–1998), regular cover artist
 JLA Gallery (1997), untitled pin-up
 The Foot Soldiers (1996), untitled pin-up
 Batman Chronicles Gallery #1 (1996), Gaijin jam pin-up
 Wildstorm Ultimate Sports #1 (1996), untitled pin-up
 Sovereign Seven Plus 1 (1996), untitled pin-up
 Shi: Senryaku #3 (1995), untitled pin-up
 Grendel Warchild TPB (1995), untitled pin-up
 WildC.A.T.S. Adventures Sourcebook #1 (1995), untitled pin-up
 Hawkman Annual #2 (1995), Golden-age Hawkman pin-up
 Team Youngblood #12 (1995), untitled pin-up
 Homage Studios Swimsuit Special #1 (1994), untitled pin-up
 Amazing Heroes Spoof Swimsuit Special #1 (1993), untitled pin-up

Awards and recognition
Nominated for two 2010 Glyph Awards (Best Male Character and Fan Award for Best Comic), both for Black Lightning: Year One, alongside writer Jen Van Meter.
June 2011 Inkwell Awards Ambassador (June 2011 – present)
GLAAD Media Award For Outstanding Comic Book for Detective Comics, by Greg Rucka, JH Williams III, and Cully Hamner

References

External links

Cully Hamner's Official Web Hub

Gaijin Studios' Official Website
Cully Hamner's Original Artwork Representative

Interviews
Getting DOWN with Cully Hamner, Comics Bulletin, September 2, 2005
Who's That Bug? Hamner on Blue Beetle (cached), Newsarama, December 7, 2005
Cully Hamner, The Outhouse, April 19, 2006
Cully Hamner Signs DC Exclusive, Newsarama, March 24, 2009
Cully Hamner: Giving The Question a Fresh Look, Newsarama, March 30, 2009

Artists from Alabama
People from Huntsville, Alabama
Living people
1969 births
American comics artists
American comics writers
People from Austin, Texas